Unbreakable Tour may refer to:

Unbreakable Tour (Backstreet Boys tour) (2008–2009)
Unbreakable World Tour (Janet Jackson tour) (2015–2016)
Unbreakable World Tour (Scorpions tour) (2004–2006)
Unbreakable Tour (Tori Kelly tour) (2016)
Unbreakable Tour (Westlife concert tour) (2003)